Malatya Museum is a museum in Malatya, Turkey

The museum faces Kernek square in Malatya at 

Although a smaller museum was established in 1971, the present museum building was opened in 1979.

Majority of the items in the museum are from various excavations like Arslantepe (Melid), Pirot, Caferhöyük, Köşkerbaba, İmamoğlu and Değirmentepe. There are also some items which are found during the construction of Karakaya Dam. These are from neolithic, chalcolithic, bronze Age, Hittites, Urartu, Roman Empire, Byzantine Empire, Anatolian Seljuks, Anatolian Beyliks and the Ottoman Empire eras.
Some of the more important items in the museum are the following:

Neolithic sculptures (dated to B.C. 8000) from Caferhöyük excavations
Early Bronze Age swords (dated to B.C. 3200-3800) from Arslantepe excavations
Human tomb (dated to B.C. 4000) from Arslantepe excavations

References

Buildings and structures in Malatya
1979 establishments in Turkey
Museums in Turkey
Tourist attractions in Malatya
Museums established in 1979
Archaeological museums in Turkey